Didam (locally, Diem) is a town in the Netherlands in the eastern part of Netherlands in the region of "De Achterhoek", province of Gelderland. It is located in the municipality of Montferland about 18 km east of Arnhem, which is the capital of the province, and about 11 km west from Doetinchem.

History 
People in Didam speak a dialect called "diems", and many people speak achterhoeks (which is the dialect of the region "Achterhoek") which is very similar to diems. These two dialect are part of the nedersaksies.

Didam was a separate municipality until 1 January 2005, when it merged with Bergh to create the new municipality of Montferland. The church is dedicated to St. Mary.

Transport 
The Didam railway station was opened on 15 July 1885 and is located on the Winterswijk–Zevenaar railway line.

Notable people 
Everard Ter Laak (5 November 1868 – 5 May 1931), Dutch Roman Catholic missionary.
Paul Peters (born 1942 in Roosteren), Dutch politician
Jos Som (born 1951 in Didam), Dutch politician.
Theo Rasing (born 1953 in Didam), Dutch professor of experimental physics.
Ernie Brandts (born 1956 in Didam), Dutch football manager and former player.
Geert Hammink (born  1969 in Didam), Dutch professional basketball player.
Manfred Dikkers (born 1971 in Didam), Dutch drummer.
Geert-Jan Derksen (born 1975 in Didam), Dutch rower.

Gallery

See also 
Didam (disambiguation)

References

External links

Municipalities of the Netherlands disestablished in 2005
Populated places in Gelderland
Former municipalities of Gelderland
Montferland